Petre Bădeanțu (12 March 1929 – 12 January 1993) was a Romanian footballer who played as a striker.

International career
Petre Bădeanțu played one game at international level for Romania, in a 1948 Balkan Cup match against Albania which ended with a 1–0 loss.

Honours
Locomotiva Timișoara
Cupa României runner-up: 1947–48
CCA București
Divizia A: 1951, 1953
Cupa României: 1951

References

External links

Petre Bădeanțu at Labtof.ro

1929 births
1993 deaths
Romanian footballers
Romania international footballers
Association football forwards
Liga I players
FC CFR Timișoara players
FC Steaua București players
Sportspeople from Timișoara